151 people have officially served as captains of the England national football teams. The current captains are Harry Kane (men's) and Leah Williamson (women's).

The first England captain was Cuthbert Ottaway; he captained England in the first ever international match, against Scotland on 30 November 1872. He went on to captain England on just one further occasion, the third international match, on 7 March 1874, against the same opposition. Alexander Morten captained England in their first international on home soil, 8 March 1873, also against Scotland, and was the first international captain to win a match. Having previously played for Scotland against England, this was his only international appearance for England. Morten remains England's oldest captain.

The first unofficial women's international match was contested by England and France in 1920, with the Dick, Kerr Ladies "England" side captained by Alice Kell. The England women's team was authorised in 1972 by the Women's Football Association (WFA), originally unaffiliated with the Football Association (FA), and had Sheila Parker as its first captain. The official England women's first international match was played against Scotland on 18 November 1972, in anticipation of the centenary of the equivalent men's match. Parker remained in her role for four years before being left out of the 1976 British Home Championship; her replacement, Carol Thomas (née McCune), was only 20 with five prior caps when she took the armband, and retained it for nearly a decade. Women's players between 1972 and 1993 were not all officially recognised until 2022; there were also several prior to 1972, who were not sanctioned and are not recognised. Thomas is England's youngest official captain under the WFA; Keira Walsh is England's youngest official captain under the FA; Carol Wilson and Casey Stoney unofficially served as captains when younger than Thomas and Walsh.

Billy Wright set the record for most captaincies of his country in 1959, with 90. Bobby Moore, who remains England's youngest men's captain and the only England captain to have lifted the World Cup, reached 90 captaincies in 1973, sharing the record with Wright. Steph Houghton has the record for captaincies of the women's team, and outright second-most caps as captain behind Wright and Moore, with 72. Seven male players were captain in their only international cap, the last of these being in 1925.

Several women's matches have seen two players start as co-captains. The most players known to wear the captain's armband for England in one match is four, which has happened twice. On 3 June 2003, Michael Owen started as captain before Emile Heskey took over at half time, Phil Neville replaced him in the sixty-first minute, and Jamie Carragher was handed the armband in the eighty-seventh. On 30 November 2021, Millie Bright started as captain before Ellen White took over at half time, Keira Walsh replaced her in the sixtieth minute, and Alex Greenwood took the armband in the seventy-first.

Men's team

Captain chronology 
 Bold indicates current captain
Italics indicates still-active players
 Source unless specified:

Captains by tournament
Bold indicates tournament winners
Italics indicates tournament hosts
Source:

Women's team

Captain chronology 

 Bold indicates current captain
Italics indicates still-active players
 indicates player was captain for matches under the Women's Football Association

Captains by tournament 
Bold indicates tournament winners
Italics indicates tournament hosts

Captains by appearances as captain
Figures include all recognised matches up to 22 February 2023. Only confirmed captaincies of named captains are counted.

The default order for this list is by most appearances as captain, then chronological order of first captaincy.

 Bold indicates permanent captain of England
Italics indicates still-active players
 Sources unless specified:

Captains by age 
 Bold indicates permanent captain of England (not necessarily at time of the relevant match/es)

Youngest captains 
Players who started as captain at under 25 years of age.

Oldest captains 
Players who started as captain at over 35 years of age.

Others

Disputed captains
These players may have officially captained England, but sources are either uncertain or differ.

Unofficial captains

The following players have never been named, i.e. started a match as, captain, but were given the armband partway through a match after that game's captain was either sent off or substituted. As records for such mid-game changes are not often kept, this list may be incomplete:

Amateurs 

For a period after the introduction of professionalism, the England team split into two teams that represented the nation internationally, one only including amateur players. This or other amateur English teams also represented Great Britain at the Olympics, when known as "England" in certain early competitions.

Captains of other non-official teams
Before the men's and women's teams each became officially associated, different teams represented them in international tournaments.

Bold indicates tournament winners

Non-official captains by appearances as captain

The following players have never captained England officially, but have started a match as named captain of a team representing England, with the match and/or team not officially recognised:

Only known, confirmed, non-official caps as captain are included.

Others by age
 Bold indicates permanent captain of England (not necessarily at time of the relevant match/es)

Unofficial young captaincies

Unofficial old captaincies

Notes

References

External links
 England football captains database

captains
England
Association football player non-biographical articles